Fred, or FRED, was an early chatterbot written by Robby Garner.

History
The name Fred was initially suggested by Karen Lindsey, and then Robby jokingly came up with an acronym, "Functional Response Emulation Device." Fred has also been implemented as a Java application by Paco Nathan called JFRED .

Fred Chatterbot is designed to explore Natural Language communications between people and computer programs. In particular, this is a study of conversation between people and ways that a computer program can learn from other people's conversations to make its own conversations.

Fred used a minimalistic "stimulus-response" approach. It worked by storing a database of statements and their responses, and made its own reply by looking up the input statements made by a user and then rendering the corresponding response from the database. This approach simplified the complexity of the rule base, but required expert coding and editing for modifications.

Fred was a predecessor to Albert One, which Garner used in 1998 and 1999 to win the Loebner Prize.

See also
Albert One
Conditioning
Robby Garner

References

External links
Download Fred simonlaven.com
JFRED mac.com
Turing Hub testing turinghub.com
Chatbot Guide

Chatbots